Still Connected is the second collaborative studio album by Lil' Flip and Mr. Capone-E, released in 2007. It peaked at No. 68 on the Billboard Top R&B/Hip-Hop Albums chart.

Track listing
Still Connected
Get My Work from the Ese's (featuring Hi Power Soldiers & Clover G's)
They Got Me Trapped (Mr. Capone-E)
All Our Enemies Ducks Us (Lil' Flip)
I'm a Banger (T.I. Diss)
Real Talk
Would You (Lil' Flip)
Player Needs No Love (Mr. Capone-E)
Vato's Got My Back (Lil' Flip featuring Clover G's)
Still in My Drop Top (featuring Mr. Criminal)
If You Don't Know Me Back Then (Lil' Flip)
Play a Street Banger
Throw Your H's Up (Mr. Capone-E featuring Hi Power Soldiers)
Young Fly and Flashy (Lil' Flip)
Wanna Roll with Us
Times in the Hood (Mr. Capone-E)
Hi Power Music 2008 (Mr. Capone-E & Lil' Flip)

Trivia
The song "I'm A Banger" is a diss towards T.I., at the time when Lil' Flip and T.I. had beef.

The song "Still In My Drop Top" is a part 2 after the song "Drop Top Chevy" featuring Mr. Capone-E, Mr. Criminal & Lil' Flip.

References

External links
 

2008 albums
Lil' Flip albums
Mr. Capone-E albums
Collaborative albums